Qaleh Now (also Romanized as Qal`eh Now) is a village in Howmeh Rural District, in the Central District of Bam County, Kerman Province, Iran. At the 2006 census, its population was 48, in 11 families.

References 

Populated places in Bam County